Matteo Politano (born 3 August 1993) is an Italian professional footballer who plays as a winger (on both the left and the right flanks) or as a second striker for Serie A club Napoli and the Italy national team.

Club career

Roma
Of Calabrian origin from Fiumefreddo Bruzio, Politano is a youth product of A.S. Roma, with whom he won the 2010 "Allievi" U17 league, as well as the 2011 Campionato Nazionale Primavera and the 2012 Coppa Italia Primavera. He was the sixth highest scorer of Roma's youth squad in the 2011–12 season (7 goals), behind Junior Tallo, Nicolás López, Gianluca Leonardi, Federico Viviani and Giammario Piscitella.  In July 2012, Politano was loaned to Perugia. He made his professional debut in the Coppa Italia. Politano was the starting forward in the 2012–13 Lega Pro Prima Divisione, with 3 goals in first 5 league matches in September.

Pescara
On 30 June 2013, Pescara signed Politano (€500,000) and Piscitella (€1.5 million) as part of the deal that Caprari returned to Roma (€2 million); however, Caprari returned to Pescara again (€1.5 million) for Piscitella (€1.5 million) in January 2014.

On 27 June 2015, Roma bought back Politano for €601,000, with Caprari moving to Pescara outright for €125,000.

Sassuolo
On 2 July 2015, Serie A club Sassuolo signed Politano in a temporary deal with an option to purchase. In June 2016, Sassuolo exercised their option to buy Politano.

Inter Milan
On 30 June 2018, Politano signed for Inter Milan on a season-long loan deal from Sassuolo, with an option to buy in June 2019.

He made his official debut for the club on 19 August in the first match of 2018–19 Serie A against his parent club Sassuolo, which ended in a 1–0 away loss. On 15 September, Politano played his 100th Serie A match in a 1–0 shock loss to Parma at home. Two weeks later, he made his debut in the UEFA Champions League in a 2–1 comeback win over Tottenham Hotspur at San Siro in the first group stage match.

On 29 September, he opened his scoring account for Inter in the league match against Cagliari, netting the second with a long-range strike in a 2–0 home win. During the course of 2018–19 season, Politano was the most used out-field player, having made 48 appearances in all competitions; only goalkeeper Samir Handanović playing more than him. As a result, on 19 June 2019 Inter exercised their option to buy Politano from Sassuolo.

However, with the appointment of head coach Antonio Conte and subsequent switch of formation from 4–3–3 to 3–5–2, Politano soon lost his place in the team's usual starting line-up. In January 2020, Politano passed the medical at Roma and was due to be exchanged for Leonardo Spinazzola yet the transfer collapsed as Inter were not entirely satisfied with Spinazzola's physical conditions and failed at re-negotiation of the deal.

Napoli
On 28 January 2020, Politano moved to Napoli on a two-year loan with an obligation to make deal permanent. On 29 October 2020, he scored the only goal in a 1–0 away win over Real Sociedad in the 2020–21 UEFA Europa League.

International career
Politano received his first Italy U19 call-up against the Italy U20 "C" side in December 2011. He then played two times during the team's 2012 UEFA European Under-19 Football Championship elite qualification campaign (featuring as a substitute for Elio De Silvestro) and appeared in two friendlies before the elite round of the competition.

On 5 November 2016, Politano was called up to the senior squad for the first time for the 2018 FIFA World Cup qualification match against Liechtenstein and a friendly match against Germany by manager Gian Piero Ventura. He later made his senior international debut for the national team on 28 May 2018, under manager Roberto Mancini, starting for Italy in a 2–1 friendly win over Saudi Arabia. On 20 November 2018, he scored his first goal for Italy on his second cap in the 94th minute of a 1–0 friendly match win over the United States, held in Genk.

Style of play
Politano is a quick and diminutive left-footed player, with an eye for goal, who is gifted with pace, vision, good technique, and dribbling ability at speed, as well as good close control and first-time passing ability in close spaces. A versatile player, he is usually deployed as a winger, and is capable of playing on either flank, as well as in numerous other attacking roles across the front line, including as a second striker. He also possesses a good shot from distance, and is a threat from set-pieces.

Personal life
On 20 November 2021, it was announced that Politano tested positive for COVID-19, while being asymptomatic, amid its pandemic in Italy; he recovered by 29 November.

Married in June 2018 to Silvia Di Vincenzo, he later became engaged to PR Ginevra Sozzi. On June 17, 2021, their first daughter, Giselle, was born.

Career statistics

Club

International

Scores and results list Italy's goal tally first.

Honours
Napoli
Coppa Italia: 2019–20

References

External links
Profile at the S.S.C. Napoli website
 
 Lega Serie B profile 
 Lega Serie A profile 
 UEFA profile 
 FIGC profile 

Italian footballers
A.S. Roma players
A.C. Perugia Calcio players
Delfino Pescara 1936 players
U.S. Sassuolo Calcio players
Inter Milan players
S.S.C. Napoli players
Association football forwards
Serie A players
Serie B players
Serie C players
Italy international footballers
Italy youth international footballers
Italy under-21 international footballers
Footballers from Rome
People of Calabrian descent
1993 births
Living people